Tramping may refer to:

Travel
Hiking
Trekking
Tramping in New Zealand, a style of backpacking or hiking
Czech tramping, a Czech outdoors pastime

Places
Rural Municipality of Tramping Lake No. 380, Saskatchewan, Canada
Tramping Lake, Saskatchewan, Canada

Other uses
Trampin', an album by Patti Smith
Flounder tramping, a method of catching flounder or other flat fish

See also

 Backpacking (disambiguation), also called tramping

 Trekking (disambiguation)
 Tramping Lake (disambiguation)
 Tramp (disambiguation)